Georg Gawliczek (2 February 1919 – 4 September 1999) was a German football manager and former player.

References 
 

1919 births
1999 deaths
People from Opava District
German footballers
Association football wingers
MSV Duisburg players
FC Schalke 04 players
1. FC Kaiserslautern players
1. FC Köln players
Bundesliga managers
German football managers
FC Schalke 04 managers
Hamburger SV managers
Karlsruher SC managers
FC Zürich managers
SC Young Fellows Juventus managers
Tennis Borussia Berlin managers
Hertha BSC managers
West German expatriate football managers
Freiburger FC managers
Silesian-German people
Sudeten German people
West German football managers
West German footballers
Expatriate football managers in Switzerland
West German expatriate sportspeople in Switzerland